¿Tú crees? is a Mexican comedy series produced by Jorge y Pedro Ortíz de Pinedo that premiered on Las Estrellas on 31 July 2022. It is a spin-off of Una familia de diez. The series follows Gaby (Daniela Luján) and Plutarco (Ricardo Margaleff) working in a supermarket as they attempt to become independent from their family.

In October 2022, the series was renewed for a second season.

Cast 
 Daniela Luján as Gaby del Valle de López
 Ricardo Margaleff as Plutarco López
 Pierre Angelo as Roldán
 Ingrid Martz as Irina
 Luis Manuel Ávila as Fabián 
 Lenny Zundel as Zacarías
 Natalia Madera as La Chiquis
 Adriana Moles as Gertrudis
 Lalo Palacios as Matías
 Melissa Hallivis as Lupita
 Tadeo Bonavides as Justo "Justito" López del Valle
 María Alicia Delgado as Dora

Production 
The series was announced on 14 March 2022, with filming beginning a week earlier on 7 March 2022. On 26 June 2022, the first official trailer for the series was released. On 8 October 2022, the series was renewed for a second season.

Episodes

Ratings 
 
}}

References 

2020s Mexican comedy television series
2022 Mexican television series debuts
Las Estrellas original programming
Mexican television sitcoms
Television series by Televisa
Spanish-language television shows